The National Museum of the American Sailor (formerly the Great Lakes Naval Museum) is one of 10 Navy Museums that are operated by the Naval History & Heritage Command. As an official Department of the Navy Museum, the National Museum of the American Sailor's mission is to select, collect, preserve, and interpret the history of the United States Navy with particular emphasis on the Navy's enlisted Sailor.  The National Museum of the American Sailor seeks to fulfill this mission by:

 Serving as a vital part of the heritage training process for all Navy recruits and connecting them to the Navy's long tradition of Honor, Courage, and Commitment.  The institution also plays an important role in the Navy community by hosting naval traditions and activities that promote Naval Heritage to the greater community.
 Collecting and exhibiting United States Navy history that is accurate, complete, and unbiased.
 Preserving the physical legacy and historical experiences of the Navy's enlisted Sailor for the benefit of the United States Navy and the general public.
 Anticipating the United States Navy's future historical needs by creating strategies and policies for the selection and acquisition of historical material.
 Developing innovative and inspirational educational programs and exhibits that broaden and deepen public knowledge and appreciation of the significance of the United States Sailor.

Collections and exhibits 
With more than 40,000 artifacts and records, the collections of the National Museum of the American Sailor hold an irreplaceable record of the U.S. Navy.  Featuring naval uniforms and accessories from the early 1900s to the present, and the country's largest archive of boot camp-related photographs, the collection tells the story of the American Sailor in the United States Navy.  The museum's permanent exhibits include displays related to the Navy's boot camp, the history of women and diversity in the Navy, the history of Naval Station Great Lakes and its impact on the Navy as a whole.  The museum also offers an exhibit related to the rich traditions of honor and individuality woven into naval enlisted uniforms, as well as exhibits focusing on the daily life of an enlisted Sailor.

History 
The National Museum of the American Sailor is located at Naval Station Great Lakes, the home of the Navy's only "Boot Camp."  The museum was founded in 1991 by the Great Lakes Naval Museum Foundation.  In 2008, the museum moved into its current location in Building 42, the Hostess House, which was designed in 1942 by prominent architect Gordon Bunshaft of the prestigious architectural firm Skidmore, Owings, and Merrill (SOM).  During World War II, the facility served as a welcome center for almost one million Sailors who entered boot camp before joining the fleet.  After the war, the building served various functions until it fell into disrepair and was considered for demolition.  However, it was recognized as a classic example of modern American architecture and repurposed for the establishment of the a museum which opened January 12, 2009.  By adopting the Hostess House as its home, the National Museum of the American Sailor connects enlisted Sailors, Navy families, and the general public to this unique architectural treasure and the central role it played in the Navy's wartime history.

In January 2009, the Great Lakes Naval Museum became an official Department of the Navy museum operated by the Naval History and Heritage Command (NHHC).  On May 29, 2014, Secretary of the Navy Ray Mabus issued SECNAVNOTE 5755, which officially changed the Great Lakes Naval Museum's name to the National Museum of the American Sailor.  This new title better reflects the strategic repositioning from a regional historic focus (Naval Station Great Lakes) to a museum that captures the entire experience and history of the United States Sailor and the museum's role as a source of heritage training for new recruits, fleet Sailors, and civilian visitors from throughout the country; emphasizing the story of turning civilians into Sailors, and of those Sailors' contributions to the protection of the nation.

Museum programs and resources 
The museum also offers guided tours, a lecture series, military band concerts, and STEM-based educational programing. An active volunteer corps participates in all museum functions. The museum’s collection is open to the general public for academic research via appointment.

See also
List of maritime museums in the United States
List of museum ships

References

External links
 
 National Museum of the American Sailor Foundation

United States Navy museums
Maritime museums in Illinois
Military and war museums in Illinois
Museums in Lake County, Illinois
Museums established in 2009
2009 establishments in Illinois
Naval History and Heritage Command
Museums of the Great Lakes